The Arboretum Sainte-Anastasie is an arboretum located on the grounds of the École primaire publique de Sainte-Anastasie at 333, avenue du Général De Gaulle, Sainte-Anastasie, Gard, Languedoc-Roussillon, France. The arboretum was planted from 1993–1996, and contains about 120 labeled specimens of local trees including cherry, cedar, oak, and pine. It is open daily without charge.

See also 
 List of botanical gardens in France

References 
 École primaire publique de Sainte-Anastasie

Sainte-Anastasie, Arboretum
Sainte-Anastasie, Arboretum